Rocco Pantaleo (9 September 1956 – 26 March 2010) was an Italian restaurateur, businessman and philanthropist,

Biography
Pantaleo who was born in Calabria, Italy emigrated to Australia in 1977 to find work. In 1985 he co-founded the restaurant chain La Porchetta with Felice Nania, specialising in Italian cuisine. By the time of his 2010 death it had grown to 80 restaurants, across Australia, New Zealand and Indonesia

In 1996, he shot dead Keith Lane. Lane had confronted Pantaleo over allegations he had indecently assaulted a teenage waitress, Lane's niece. The court found that Pantaleo had acted in self-defence, but he was convicted of indecently assaulting the waitress. Pantaleo also had a string of driving offenses.

Pantaleo died on 26 March 2010 in a motorcycle accident in St Kilda, Victoria, where he was driving to attend the Melbourne Grand Prix He was 53, he resided in Oak Park with his wife and four children

References

1956 births
2010 deaths
Australian people convicted of indecent assault
Australian people of Calabrian descent
Italian emigrants to Australia
Motorcycle road incident deaths
Road incident deaths in Victoria (Australia)
Australian restaurateurs